Nusantara is the Indonesian name of Maritime Southeast Asia (or parts of it). It is an Old Javanese term that literally means "outer islands". In Indonesia, it is generally taken to mean the Indonesian Archipelago.
Outside of Indonesia, the term has been adopted to refer the Malay Archipelago.

The word Nusantara is taken from an oath by Gajah Mada in 1336, as written in the Old Javanese Pararaton and Nagarakretagama. Gajah Mada was a powerful military leader and prime minister of Majapahit credited with bringing the empire to its peak of glory. Gajah Mada delivered an oath called Palapa oath, in which he vowed not to eat any food containing spices until he had conquered all of Nusantara under the glory of Majapahit.

The concept of Nusantara as a unified region was not invented by Gajah Mada in 1336. The term Nusantara was first used by Kertanegara of Singhasari in Mula Malurung inscription dated 1255. Furthermore, in 1275, the term Cakravala Mandala Dvipantara was used by him to describe the aspiration of united Southeast Asian archipelago under Singhasari and marked the beginning of his efforts to achieve it. Dvipantara is a Sanskrit word for the "islands in between", making it a synonym to Nusantara as both dvipa and nusa mean "island". Kertanegara envisioned the union of Southeast Asian maritime kingdoms and polities under Singhasari as a bulwark against the rise of the expansionist Mongol-led Yuan dynasty of China.

In a wider sense, Nusantara in modern language usage includes Austronesian-related cultural and linguistic lands, namely, Indonesia, Malaysia, Singapore, Southern Thailand, the Philippines, Brunei, East Timor and Taiwan, while excluding Papua New Guinea.

Ancient concepts

Etymology
Nusantara is an Old Javanese word which appears in the Pararaton manuscript. In Javanese, Nusantara is derived  and antara, 'between'. It means "outer islands" or "other islands" (in the sense of "islands beyond Java in between the Indian and Pacific Oceans"), referring to the islands outside of Java under hegemony of the Majapahit Empire. The term is commonly erroneously translated as "archipelago" in modern times. Based on the Majapahit concept of state, the monarch had power over three areas:

 Negara Agung, or the Grand State – the core realm of the kingdom where Majapahit formed before becoming an empire. This included the capital city and the surrounding areas where the king effectively exercised his government: the area in and around royal capital of Trowulan, port of Canggu and sections of Brantas River valley near the capital, as well as the mountainous areas south and southwest of the capital, all the way to the Pananggungan and Arjuno-Welirang peaks. The Brantas river valley corridor, connecting the Majapahit Trowulan area to Canggu and the estuarine areas in Kahuripan (Sidoarjo) and Hujung Galuh (Surabaya), is also considered to be part of Negara Agung.
 Mancanegara, the areas surrounding Negara Agung – this traditionally referred to the Majapahit provinces of East and Central Java ruled by the Bhres (dukes), the king's close relatives. This included the rest of Java as well as Madura and Bali. These areas were directly influenced by Majapahit court culture and obliged to pay annual tributes; their rulers might have been directly related to, allied with, and/or intermarried with the Majapahit royal family. Majapahit officials and officers were stationed in these places to regulate their foreign trade activities and collect taxes, but beyond this mancanegara provinces enjoyed substantial autonomy in internal affairs. In later periods, overseas provinces which had adopted Javanese culture or possessed significant trading importance were also considered mancanegara. The ruler of these provinces was either a willing vassal of the Majapahit king or a regent appointed by the king to rule the region. These realms included Dharmasraya, Pagaruyung, Lampung and Palembang in Sumatra.
 Nusantara, areas which did not reflect Javanese culture, but were included as colonies which had to pay annual tribute. This included the vassal kingdoms and colonies in Malay Peninsula, Borneo, Lesser Sunda Islands, Sulawesi, Maluku, and Sulu archipelago. These regions enjoyed substantial autonomy and internal freedom, and Majapahit officials and military officers were not necessarily stationed there; however, any challenges to Majapahit oversight might have drawn a severe response.

The word Nusantara was not only used by the Javanese and did not disappear after the fall of Majapahit. This word can be found in Malay Annals, a classic Malay literature written as early as 1612, but it remained known even in the 1808 manuscript:

Terlalu sekali besar kerajaan Baginda (Majapahit) pada zaman itu, segala seluruh Jawa semuanya dalam hukum Baginda, dan segala raja-raja Nusantarapun setengah sudah ta-luk kepada baginda.Very big was the kingdom of Baginda (the king of Majapahit) at that time, all of Java was under Baginda's law, and half of the kings of the Nusantara archipelago were submissive to Baginda.

Nusantara concept in the 20th century

In 1920, Ernest Francois Eugene Douwes Dekker (1879–1950), also known as Setiabudi, proposed Nusantara as a name for the independent country of Indonesia which did not contain any words etymologically related to the name of India or the Indies. This is the first instance of the term Nusantara appearing after it had been written into Pararaton manuscript.

The definition of Nusantara introduced by Setiabudi is different from the 14th century definition of the term. During the Majapahit era, Nusantara described vassal areas that had been conquered. Setiabudi defined Nusantara as all the Indonesian regions from Sabang to Merauke, without the aggressive connotations of its former imperial usage.

Modern usage

Indonesia
Today in Indonesian, Nusantara is synonymous with the Indonesian archipelago or the national territory of Indonesia. In this sense, the term Nusantara excludes Malaysia, Singapore, Brunei, East Timor, and the Philippines. In 1967, it has transformed into the concept of Wawasan Nusantara or "archipelagic outlook", which regards the archipelagic realm of Indonesia, the islands and seas surrounding them, as a single unity of several aspects, mainly socio-cultural, language, as well as political, economic, security and defensive unity.

Nusantara is also the name of the future capital of Indonesia.

Outside Indonesia
In Brunei, Malaysia, and Singapore the term is generally used to refer to the Malay archipelago or the Malay realm which includes those countries.

In a more scholarly manner without national borders, Nusantara in a modern language usage "refers to the sphere of influence of the Austronesian-related cultural and linguistic islands that comprise Indonesia, Malaysia, Singapore, the southernmost part of Thailand, the Philippines, Brunei, East Timor and perhaps even Taiwan, but it does not involve the areas of Papua New Guinea."

Nusantara studies
The Nusantara Society in Moscow conducts studies on the Nusantara region's history, culture, languages and politics.

See also

 East Indies
 Greater Indonesia
 History of Indonesia
 Indonesian archipelago
 Irredentism
 Islam Nusantara
 Malay Archipelago
 Malay race
 Malay world
 Malayness
 Bumiputera
 Pribumi
 Maphilindo
 Maritime Southeast Asia
 Nanyang (region)
 Nusantao Maritime Trading and Communication Network
 Nusantara Society
 Wawasan Nusantara

References

External links
 Wawasan Nusantara
 Wacana Nusantara
 UNESCO: Pararaton Manuscript (MEMORY OF THE WORLD REGISTER)
 Gajah Mada article
 History Nusantara

 
Indonesian names
Majapahit
Historical regions
Maritime Southeast Asia